The  were flamethrowers used by the Imperial Japanese Army and Imperial Japanese Navy's SNLF during the Second Sino-Japanese War and  World War II.

History and development
Japanese military observers stationed in Europe noted effectiveness of flamethrowers during the trench warfare conditions of World War I, particularly against battlefield fortifications, bunkers, pillboxes and similar protected emplacements, which had given the Japanese Army such grief during the Siege of Port Arthur during the Russo-Japanese War of 1904-1905.

The Type 93 flamethrower, largely based on European designs, entered service in 1933. It was used in Manchukuo against the ill-prepared National Revolutionary Army of the Republic of China and against local warlord forces with considerable psychological effect. However, its ignition system based on a heated electrical wire had reliability issues under cold weather conditions which led to a redesign designated the Type 100 flamethrower in 1940. Both types remained in service during World War II.

Design
Both the Type 93 and Type 100 consisted of a fuel unit, fuel hose, and flame gun. A modification in the design of the flame gun is the only difference between the two types.
The total fuel capacity was 12.3 liters. Fuel was a mixture of gasoline and tar. Pressure was controlled by a manually operated needle valve, one on the top of each of the two fuel cylinders. This tank assembly was fitted with straps to permit it to be carried on the operator's back like an infantry pack.

The  fuel hose was made of reinforced rubber tubing, with brass fittings on both ends. The flame gun, three to four feet long, was a  diameter tube with a fuel ejection handle located near the hose connection, and a 6 mm (1/4-inch) nozzle with the firing mechanism attached to the other end.

Fuel (in the Type 100) was ignited by a blank cartridge fired from a revolver mechanism in the flame gun, which held ten rounds. The fuel ejection handle fired a cartridge when it opened the fuel ejection valve. When the handle was returned to its closed position parallel to the tube, the flow of fuel stopped, and the magazine revolved to place a new cartridge in the firing position. The duration of a continuous discharge was 10 to 12 seconds with a maximum range of 22 to 27 meters.

Combat record

Flamethrowers were assigned to engineering regiments within each Japanese infantry division. A typical engineering regiment would be equipped with between six and twenty flamethrowers, which were operated by a designated flamethrower company. The Type 100 Flamethrower was primarily used in the early stages of the Pacific War, mostly in the Dutch East Indies, Burma and the Philippines. Type 100-equipped Japanese paratroopers participated in the Battle of Palembang in 1942. There was little need for flamethrowers later in the war since Japan was on the defensive and had few opportunities to attack enemy fortifications. In later stages of the war, the Japanese army attempted to use the Type 100 flamethrower as an anti-tank weapon, largely due to lack of any effective anti-tank guns, and with some success.

See also
List of flamethrowers

References

 
 Bishop, Chris (eds) The Encyclopedia of Weapons of World War II. Barnes & Nobel. 1998.

External links
Taki’s Imperial Japanese Army page
U.S. Intelligence Report
US Technical Manual E 30-480
 video about The Japanese Type 93 and its slightly-improved sister the Type 100

World War II infantry weapons of Japan
Flamethrowers
Military equipment introduced in the 1930s